The Eritrean War of Independence was fought as a guerrilla campaign by two main Eritrean liberation fronts, first by the Eritrean Liberation Front (ELF) and then, after the Eritrean Civil War, by the Eritrean People's Liberation Front (EPLF) against the Imperial Army of the Ethiopian Empire, and later the Marxist Derg. This asymmetrical campaign against Ethiopian control left the Army at a disadvantage and so it embarked on a policy of destroying Eritrean villages. It was hoped that this would prevent the separatists from continuing their campaign. Listed below are some of the major civilian massacres committed by both the Ethiopian Empire and the Derg.

List

See also

 Eritrean War of Independence

References

Eritrean War of Independence
Lists of events in Eritrea
Eritrean War of Independence
Massacres in Africa
Massacres in Eritrea